The 2018 La Flèche Wallonne was a road cycling one-day race that took place on 18 April 2018 in Belgium. It was the 82nd edition of the La Flèche Wallonne and the seventeenth event of the 2018 UCI World Tour.

During the third and final ascent of the Mur de Huy,  rider Julian Alaphilippe accelerated near the summit, overtaking race leader Jelle Vanendert in the last 100 metres of the race and dropping him. It was the biggest victory of Alaphilippe's career at that point, becoming the first French winner of the race since Laurent Jalabert in 1997.

Teams
As La Flèche Wallonne was a UCI World Tour event, all eighteen UCI WorldTeams were invited automatically and obliged to enter a team in the race. Seven UCI Professional Continental teams competed as wildcards, completing the 25-team peloton.

Result

References

External links

2018 UCI World Tour
2018 in Belgian sport
2018
April 2018 sports events in Belgium